The Common Law is a 1916 American silent drama film directed by Albert Capellani and starring Clara Kimball Young, Conway Tearle, and Paul Capellani. It was made at Fort Lee and distributed by the newly formed Selznick Pictures. Shortly afterwards the company switched production to Hollywood.

Cast
 Clara Kimball Young as Valerie West 
 Conway Tearle as Neville 
 Paul Capellani as Querida 
 Edna Hunter as Rita 
 Lillian Cook as Stephanie 
 Julia Stuart as Mrs. Neville 
 Edward Kimball as Mr. Neville 
 Lydia Knott as Mrs. West 
 D.J. Flanagan as Ogilvy

References

Bibliography
 Stewart, Jacqueline Najuma. Migrating to the Movies: Cinema and Black Urban Modernity. University of California Press, 2005.

External links

1916 films
1916 drama films
1910s English-language films
American silent feature films
Silent American drama films
Films directed by Albert Capellani
American black-and-white films
Selznick Pictures films
Films shot in Fort Lee, New Jersey
Films based on works by Robert W. Chambers
1910s American films